Maria Mazzeo Syms (born January 10, 1968) is an American politician and a former Republican member of the Arizona House of Representatives elected to represent District 28 from 2017 to 2019. Syms is an Arizona Assistant Attorney General, a Paradise Valley Town Councilwoman and a former Assistant United States Attorney. She was also on the Paradise Valley planning Commission from 2003 until 2013.

Education
Syms received her bachelor's degree in political science from Smith College in 1989, her Juris Doctor degree from American University in 1992 and a master's degree in public administration from Harvard University in 2014.

Elections
 2016 – With incumbents Kate Brophy McGee and Eric Meyer both running for the state senate, Maria Syms and Mary Hamway defeated Kenneth Bowers, Matt Morales and Alberto Gutier in the open District 28 Republican Primary. Syms and Democratic candidate Kelli Butler defeated Republican Mary Hamway in the general election.
 2014 – Syms was elected to the Paradise Valley city council, receiving 1,827 votes.
 2012 – Syms ran for Mayor of Paradise Valley, Arizona, losing to incumbent Mayor Scott LeMarr.

References

External links
 Biography at Ballotpedia
 Vote Smart

1968 births
Women state legislators in Arizona
Republican Party members of the Arizona House of Representatives
Living people
Harvard Kennedy School alumni
Smith College alumni
Washington College of Law alumni
People from Paradise Valley, Arizona
Arizona lawyers
21st-century American women